The 4th constituency of Gard is a French legislative constituency in the Gard département.  It consists of the cantons of Alès-2, Alès-3, Pont-Saint-Esprit
and the communes of Barjac, Lussan, Saint-Ambroix, Saint-Chaptes and Vézénobres.

Deputies

Election Results

2022

 
 
 
 
 
 
 
 
|-
| colspan="8" bgcolor="#E9E9E9"|
|-

2017

2012

2007

 
 
 
 
 
 
|-
| colspan="8" bgcolor="#E9E9E9"|
|-

2002

 
 
 
 
 
|-
| colspan="8" bgcolor="#E9E9E9"|
|-

1997

 
 
 
 
 
 
 
|-
| colspan="8" bgcolor="#E9E9E9"|
|-

References

Gard
French legislative constituencies of Gard